Trigonidium egertonianum is an orchid found in Central and South America.

Taxonomy

The specific epithet "egertonianum" is named for Sir Egerton.

Description

Trigonidium egertonianum has densely clustered pseudobulbs, ovoid in shape with two leaves. The sepals, petals, and lip are yellow-green to pinkish brown, with brown veins and markings.

The species produces extrafloral nectar.

References

Plants described in 1838
Orchids of South America
Orchids of Central America
Orchids of Belize
Maxillariinae